Peter Olofsson (born 15 June 1957) is a former Swedish handball player who competed in the 1984 Summer Olympics.

In 1984 he finished fifth with the Swedish team in the Olympic tournament. He played all six matches and scored 19 goals.

References

1957 births
Living people
Swedish male handball players
Olympic handball players of Sweden
Handball players at the 1984 Summer Olympics